"The KKK Took My Baby Away" is a song by American punk rock band Ramones, released in 1981 through Sire Records. It was written by front man and lead vocalist Joey Ramone and appears on the band's sixth studio album Pleasant Dreams (1981).

The protagonist sings that his girlfriend has been kidnapped by the Ku Klux Klan on her way to Los Angeles for the holidays and pleads with the listener to call federal authorities to find out where she is and whether she is still alive.

In End of the Century: The Story of the Ramones, a documentary film about the Ramones, Ramones tour manager Monte Melenick stated that it seemed clear to him that Joey must have been obliquely referring to Johnny Ramone (who used to tease Joey for being Jewish) "stealing" away his girlfriend, Linda.

Joey's brother Mickey Leigh has disagreed, saying that the song had been written before Joey learned of their affair. Leigh explains that the song was in response to Joey's relationship with a black woman, whose parents disapproved of the interracial relationship. Leigh asked Joey what happened to the girl and Joey responded by saying "the KKK took my baby away."

Former Drummer Marky Ramone claimed in an interview for website Loudwire that the song was inspired by Joey's experience at a mental institution. Reportedly, the lead singer befriended Wilna, an African-American woman who was also in the same institution. Wilna and Joey began to date in the early 1970s until her parents’ objections to Wilna dating a Jewish man tore them apart. According to Marky Ramone, the song was written about this episode.

Music
Like almost all Ramones songs, the time signature is 4/4. The song is in the key of G Major. It alternates two verses with a chorus; the second chorus is followed by a bridge, after which the first verse and the chorus are repeated with a change of key to A Major.

In the documentary End of the Century: The Story of the Ramones, Johnny Ramone states that the guitar riff of "The KKK Took My Baby Away" was inspired by the riff of Cheap Trick's "He's a Whore".

References

Ramones songs
1981 songs
Songs written by Joey Ramone